Aderlandi Silva  (born ) is a Brazilian Paralympic sitting volleyball player. She is part of the Brazil women's national sitting volleyball team.

She competed at the 2012 Summer Paralympics, finishing 5th. At club level she played for Sesi in 2012.

See also
 Brazil at the 2012 Summer Paralympics

References

External links
Watch Out for Brazil

1976 births
Living people
Volleyball players at the 2012 Summer Paralympics
Paralympic volleyball players of Brazil
Brazilian women's sitting volleyball players
Place of birth missing (living people)